Gustavo Hugo Fermani (born 14 January 1969) is an Argentine football manager, currently in charge of Uruguayan club Racing Montevideo.

Career
Fermani started working as a youth coach at River Plate in 2006, before leaving in 2010 due to the club's change of presidency. He returned in late 2013, and was appointed manager of their reserve squad in December 2019, along with Juan José Borrelli.

Fermani and Borrelli left their role as manager of River's reserve team in December 2021, after first team manager Marcelo Gallardo opted to appoint Jonathan La Rosa in charge. While Borrelli remained at River in another role, Fermani opted to leave the club. 

Shortly after leaving River, Fermani joined Racing Montevideo in Uruguay as a youth coordinator. On 16 November 2022, he replaced Damián Santín at the helm of the first team in the Primera División.

References

1969 births
Living people
Argentine football managers
Racing Club de Montevideo managers
Argentine expatriate football managers
Argentine expatriate sportspeople in Uruguay
Expatriate football managers in Uruguay